Jean-Jacques Guyon (21 December 1932 – 20 December 2017) was a French equestrian and Olympic champion from Paris. He won an individual gold medal in eventing at the 1968 Summer Olympics in Mexico City.

References

External links
 

1932 births
2017 deaths
Sportspeople from Paris
French male equestrians
Olympic equestrians of France
Equestrians at the 1968 Summer Olympics
Olympic gold medalists for France
Olympic medalists in equestrian
Medalists at the 1968 Summer Olympics
20th-century French people